Maranhão Atlético Clube, usually known as Maranhão or MAC, is a Brazilian football club from São Luís, Maranhão state.

They are currently ranked fifth among Maranhão teams in CBF's national club ranking, at 166th place overall.

History
Maranhão Atlético Clube was founded on 24 September 1932.

In 1937, Maranhão won the Campeonato Maranhense, which was the club's first title.

In 1979, Maranhão competed in the Campeonato Brasileiro Série A for the first time, finishing in the 26th place.

In 1980, Maranhão competed again in the Série A's first division, finishing in the 44th place (the competition's last position). The club was relegated to the second division.

In 2000, the club was the Copa Norte's runner-up. São Raimundo beat the club in the final.

Titles
Campeonato Maranhense: 14
1937, 1941, 1943, 1951, 1963, 1969, 1970, 1979, 1993, 1994, 1995, 1999, 2007, 2013

Campeonato Maranhense Second Division: 1
2015

Copa Norte: 0
Runner-up (1): 2000

Stadium

The club's home matches are usually played at Castelão stadium, which has a maximum capacity of 70,000 people.

Current squad

First team

Mascot and nickname
The club's mascot is a goat. Maranhão is nicknamed Bode Gregório, Demolidor de Cartazes, and Quadricolor.

References

External links
Arquivo de Clubes website 

 
Association football clubs established in 1932
Football clubs in Maranhão
1932 establishments in Brazil